
Horst Großmann (19 November 1891 – 4 May 1972) was a German general in the Wehrmacht of Nazi Germany during World War II who commanded the 6th Infantry Division. He was a recipient of the  Knight's Cross of the Iron Cross with Oak Leaves.

Awards and decorations
 Iron Cross (1914)  2nd Class (1 October 1914) & 1st Class  (25 October 1916)
 Clasp to the Iron Cross (1939)  2nd Class (18 May 1940) & 1st Class (28 May 1940)
 German Cross in Gold on 11 February 1943 as Generalmajor and commander of the 6th Infantry Division 
 Knight's Cross of the Iron Cross with Oak Leaves
 Knight's Cross on 19 July 1940 as Oberst and commander of 84th Infantry Regiment
 292nd Oak Leaves on 4 September 1943 as Generalleutnant and commander of the 6th Infantry Division

References

Citations

Bibliography

 
 
 

1891 births
1972 deaths
People from Ełk County
People from East Prussia
Generals of Infantry (Wehrmacht)
Prussian Army personnel
German Army personnel of World War I
Recipients of the Gold German Cross
Recipients of the Knight's Cross of the Iron Cross with Oak Leaves
German prisoners of war in World War II held by the United Kingdom
Recipients of the clasp to the Iron Cross, 1st class
Reichswehr personnel
German Army generals of World War II